The 1983 Basildon District Council election took place on 5 May 1983 to elect members of Basildon District Council in Essex, England. This was on the same day as other local elections. The Labour Party retained control of the council, which it had won at the previous election in 1982.

Overall results

|-
| colspan=2 style="text-align: right; margin-right: 1em" | Total
| style="text-align: right;" | 14
| colspan=5 |
| style="text-align: right;" | 48,704
| style="text-align: right;" |

Ward results

Billericay East

Billericay West

Burstead

Fryerns Central

Fryerns East

Laindon

Langdon Hills

Lee Chapel North

Nethermayne

Pitsea East

Pitsea West

Vange

Wickford North

Wickford South

References

1983
1983 English local elections
1980s in Essex